Stadtmuseum Bonn was founded in 1989 and is dedicated to the representation of Bonn's city and cultural history as well as the presentation and maintenance of the extensive collection. The museum rooms are currently located in a building erected in the 1970s at Franziskanerstraße 9, opposite the university building adjacent to Koblenzer Tor in downtown Bonn . The two floors used by the museum previously belonged to the sauna and cleaning wing of the now abandoned Viktoriabad .  A further whereabouts in the premises is unclear.

History
In 1886 an association was founded in Bonn with the aim of creating a city history museum. Today's Bonner Heimat- und Geschichtsverein transferred its extensive collection to the city of Bonn in the mid-1950s. As a result, there was close cooperation between the association and the city archive. In the anniversary year 1989 ("2000 years of Bonn"), the city council under Mayor Bärbel Dieckmann  decided to found the Stadtmuseum Bonn, although no suitable premises were available at the time. In the early years only the small Ernst-Moritz-Arndt-Haus in the Adenauerallee 79. Small special exhibitions and cultural events take place here. The founding director of the museum was the head of the city archives, Manfred van Rey. The opening of the actual showrooms for the permanent exhibition of the Stadtmuseum Bonn ("From Roman times to today") in the later allocated building on Franziskanerstraße took place on January 14, 1998 on 1000 square meters.

References

External links 

 
 Schumann-Portal, a project of the Stadtmuseum
 Information on the Bonn Memorial. In: schwarzaufweiss.de

Museums in Bonn
1998 establishments in Germany
Libraries in Bonn
History of Bonn